Rodney Blaze (Rotterdam, 14 June 1973) is a Dutch rock singer, who, in addition to his solo-albums, is especially known for his contributions to Arjen Anthony Lucassen's Ayreon and Star One projects. He has been active in various bands since 1991.

Music career 
Rodney Blaze comes from a family of entertainers, his mother emigrated to the United Arabic Emirates where she became a professional dancer, Rodney's father Beau Frazier has been a singer for several decades. After years of preparation, Blaze applied as a singer in a local band. Later he was approached by Block Busters-guitarist Hans van den Heuvel, for a project called Fatal Attraction. That is where the album Wonderland originates from. In 1995, Blaze became the front man of The Block Busters, with whom he played in The Netherlands, Belgium and Germany. They shared the stage with, among others, Sweet, Mud and Slade, and were an integral part of the '70's Roadshow', featuring Top Pop-host Ad Visser. In 2005, multi-instrumentalist Arjen Anthony Lucassen asked Blaze to work on an updated version of his debut album, The Final Experiment. Blaze and Lucassen also co-operated on Ayreon's later album, Timeline, and the second Star One album, Victims of the Modern Age. In 2005, Blaze became a member of the band Xenobia, with whom he released the EP "Burn It Away". Xenobia performed as a support-act for bands such as After Forever,Stream of Passion and Kingfisher Sky.

Career 
 Judgement – (1991/1992)
 SJIAWN – (1992/1995)
 Wheels of Fire  – (1993/1994)
 Unknown Fact  – (1994/1995)
 Block Busters – (1995/2015)
 Deep Treased – (1999/2000)
 The Red Cars  –  (2001/2002)
 Delores  – (2002/2003)
 Xenobia – (2005/2009)
 Monsters of Pop – (2010/2012)
 Blaze of Darkness – (2011/2012)
 Magoria - (2018/still active)
 Magic O Mertal - (2019/still active)

Discography

Rodney Blaze 
 Back to the Future (1997)
 Pink Bagger (1998)
 Behind Doors (2002)

Ayreon 
 The Final Experiment (2005)
 Timeline (2008)

Block Busters 
 Powder to the People (1999)

Xenobia 
 Burn it Away (EP, 2008)

Fatal Attraction 
 Wonderland (1995)

Star One 
 Victims of the Modern Age (2010)

Magoria 
 JTR1888 (2019)

Magic-O-Metal 
 Enter the Metal Realm (2020)

Other

Powerwolf
 Call of the Wild (2021) (Backing vocal collaboration)

Shared stage with 
Rodney Blaze shared stage with:
 "Sjiawn": Sjako
 "Monsters of Pop": Doro Pesch, Dr. Feelgood
 "Xenobia" (now known as "Blaze of Darkness"): After Forever, Kingfisher Sky, Stream of Passion, Autumn
 "The Block Busters": Ad Visser, Band Zonder Banaan, Barrelhouse, Bert Heerink, Birgit, Boney M, Cesar Zuiderwijk, Equals, Fischer Z, George McCrae, Gibson Brothers, Gruppo Sportivo, Happy Tunes, Is Ook Schitterend, Mud, Pasadena's, Peter Koelewijn, Rich Wyman, Shoes, Slade, Sweet, Three Degrees, Uriah Heep, VOF De Kunst, Zombies

References 
 Magoria – JtR1888
 Magic O Metal - Enter The Metal Realm
 Rodney Blaze – Arjen Lucassen
 Rodney Blaze

External links 
 
 Magoria /Jack the Ripper 1888 - Official website
 Magic O Metal - Official website
 Blaze of Darkness – official site 
 Ayreon – official site

1973 births
Living people
Dutch rock singers
Dutch heavy metal singers
Musicians from Rotterdam
21st-century Dutch male singers
21st-century Dutch singers